Plumb is a brand of hand tools owned by Apex Tool Group. The brand is known for its hammers and hatchets.

History 

In 1869, Fayette R. Plumb entered a partnership with Jonathan Yerkes, an established hammer manufacturer operating in the Frankford neighborhood of Philadelphia. Shortly thereafter, a new facility was built in the Bridesburg neighborhood of that city, operating as Yerkes & Plumb. The firm was one of the first in the United States to use cast steel to manufacture tools. Yerkes retired in April 1886, and Plumb bought out Yerkes' interest in the company the following year. By 1888, the company was operating solely under the Plumb name.

In 1926, Plumb objected to an attempt by the similarly named  Plomb Tool Company to register its name as a trademark. The companies negotiated an agreement, but in 1946, Plumb sued for trademark infringement because Plomb had violated the terms of this agreement. The Plomb company began selling tools under the Proto name instead.

In 1971, the Plumb Company was acquired by the Ames Company. In 1981, Plumb was sold to Cooper Industries; in 2010, the Cooper Hand Tools division was spun off into Apex Tool Group.

References

External links 
 References to Plumb tools at the Apex web site
 Workshop of the World: "Plumb"—Article on the company's production for the Allied Forces in World War I.

Tool manufacturing companies of the United States
Apex Tool Group brands
Manufacturing companies established in 1888